In organic chemistry, the Fischer–Hepp rearrangement is a rearrangement reaction in which an aromatic N-nitroso or nitrosamine converts to a carbon nitroso compound:

This organic reaction was first described by the German chemist Otto Philipp Fischer (1852–1932) and 
Eduard Hepp (June 11, 1851 – June 18, 1917)  in 1886, and is of importance because para-NO secondary anilines cannot be prepared in a direct reaction.

The rearrangement reaction takes place by reacting the nitrosamine precursor with hydrochloric acid. The chemical yield is generally good under these conditions, but often much poorer if a different acid is used. The exact reaction mechanism is unknown but there is evidence suggesting an intramolecular reaction.

Sources
Named Things in Chemical Industry

See also
Friedel–Crafts alkylation-like reactions:
Hofmann-Martius rearrangement
Fries rearrangement

References

Rearrangement reactions
Name reactions